WRDZ (1300 AM) is a Polish language broadcast radio station licensed to La Grange, Illinois, serving the Chicago metropolitan area. The station, which began broadcasting in 1950, is owned and operated by Walter Kotaba's Polnet Communications.

History
The station's original call sign was WTAQ, with the letters meaning "Western Towns Along the Q." The "Q" referred to the Chicago, Burlington and Quincy Railroad, which ran through the center of the station's coverage area. WTAQ first went on the air on October 11, 1950. The station was originally owned by La Grange Broadcasting Co. The station initially ran 500 watts and operated during daytime hours only.

WTAQ was a brokered time station and was branded "Chicago's Personality Station". The heart of this format was weekend ethnic polka programs, serving the large Eastern European population around Chicago. "Lil Wally" Jagiello, Uncle Henry Cukierka, Chet Schafer, Chet Gulinski, Eddie Blazonczyk, Johnny Hyzny, Eddie Korosa, Eddie Arenz, Art Schlaman, Jim Marwood, John Psczola, and many other polka shows made their home there.

In June 1984, William Wardle and Ralph Faucher purchased the station for $1,640,000.

Spanish era
In 1985, Lotus Communications Corporation purchased the station for $3,000,000, and it became a full-time Spanish language station. The station adopted a Spanish language adult contemporary format as "Radio Fiesta". In the late 1980s, the station's branding was changed to "La Mexicana", and the station broadcast a música norteña format. The station's "La Mexicana" format was simulcast with several other stations Lotus Communications owned. During the station's period as a Spanish language station, it carried the Spanish-language broadcasts of the Chicago White Sox.

Radio Disney era

In July 1998, ABC Radio bought WTAQ 1300 and sister station WTAU 1500 in Zion, Illinois, and their Radio Disney network began to air on the stations.

WTAQ and WTAU's call signs were later changed to WRDZ and WDDZ (this allowed the original callholders in Green Bay, Wisconsin to resume using the WTAQ calls).

In January 2000, WDDZ went off the air and remained silent until early 2001. In the spring of 2002, the station returned to the air, once again simulcasting WRDZ with Radio Disney. The simulcast ended after the station was sold to Multicultural Broadcasting of Chicago in the summer of 2002.

On August 13, 2014, Disney put WRDZ and twenty-two other Radio Disney stations up for sale, with the exception of KDIS (now KRDC) in Los Angeles, in order to focus more on digital distribution of the Radio Disney network. Disney originally planned to temporarily shut down the station on September 26, 2014. However, the station remained on the air and continued carrying Radio Disney until it was sold.

On July 30, 2015, Radio Disney Chicago filed an application to sell WRDZ to Polnet Communications. The agreed purchase price for the station is $3,450,000. Polnet is the owner of WEEF, WKTA, WNVR and WPJX (former Radio Disney O&O and former satellite of WRDZ). The station went silent on October 30, 2015. The sale was completed on December 2, 2015. The station returned to the air with a Polish language format branded "Polskie Radio", simulcasting WNVR 1030.

Translators
WRDZ is also heard on FM translators at 104.7 MHz in Chicago, and 103.1 in Park Forest. In a complaint filed with the Federal Communications Commission in 2017, 104.7 WCFL claims that its signal has been subjected to co-channel interference from translator W284DA, which relays WRDZ.

See also
 List of radio stations in Illinois

References

External links
 WRDZ's official website

Radio stations established in 1950
1950 establishments in Illinois
Polish-language radio stations in the United States
RDZ
Former subsidiaries of The Walt Disney Company